Ménarmont is a commune in the Vosges department in Grand Est in northeastern France.

Geography
The village is on the northern edge of the Vosges, on the departmental frontier with the département of Meurthe et Moselle.

The countryside here is less densely populated than that closer to Épinal (some 30 kilometres / 20 miles to the south-south-west), and since 1977 the local landfill site has welcomed 150,000 tonnes annually of domestic and industrial waste.   Plans to extend the site after it became full in 2005 were hotly contested by neighbouring communes, notably Bazien to the north-west.

See also
Communes of the Vosges department

References

Communes of Vosges (department)